Patrick Mark Denis Compton (born 28 November 1952) is a South African journalist and retired cricketer.

Background 

He played for Middlesex 2nd XI against Sussex 2nd XI as a batsman in 1968. He later played for Natal in three first-class matches in the Howa Bowl in 1979/1980. He scored 97 runs (average 19.40) with a personal best of 52.

The second son of the cricketer and footballer Denis Compton (through his second marriage), he was brought up with his younger brother Richard by their mother Valerie in South Africa.

His son, Ben, is a Kent cricketer who formerly represented Nottinghamshire.

Patrick Compton is also one of the leading cricket writers in South Africa, having worked for the Independent group in Durban for many years.

References

1952 births
Living people
KwaZulu-Natal cricketers
South African cricketers
South African people of English descent